Hubert Goltz or Goltzius (30 October 1526 – 24 March 1583) was a Renaissance painter, engraver, and printer from the Southern Netherlands.  He is not to be confused with the much more famous Hendrik Goltzius, who was his cousin, once removed.

Life
The early Flemish biographer Karel van Mander states in his Schilder-boeck (1604) that Goltzius was born in Venlo from parents who were originally from Wurzburg. He was a pupil of Lambert Lombard. He spent 12 years in Antwerp working on a book of engravings of antiquities, called "Medaglien oft tronien der Roomsche Keysers" (medallions or busts of Roman emperors).

Goltzius was married more than once.  His first wife was Lysbeth Verhulst.  Lysbeth Verhulst was the sister of Mayken Verhulst and Barbara Verhulst, who were respectively married to the painters Pieter Coecke van Aelst and Jacob de Punder.  Goltzius would occasionally collaborate on commissions with his brother-in-law Jacob de Punder.

Goltzius had his own printshop in Bruges, where he published "Caius Julius Caesar, or a history of Roman Emperors in medals" in 1563, and "The life of Julius Caesar" in 1566. In 1567 he published the book "Fastos" for which he was made an honorary Roman citizen by the Rome council (and which was noted in his next book called "Caesar Augustus" in 1574). He published his final book in 1576 on the emperors of Greece in medallions. His portrait was painted twice by Antonis Mor in exchange for his medallion book. These paintings, as well as the books, were all honored in verse by various poets. The same goes for the engraved portrait by Melchior Lorck, used in his last book from 1576 and also used independently.

He painted a "Last Judgement" in the tribunal of the city hall of Venlo in 1557, which is still installed there. He travelled to Italy in the years 1558-1560, and made a trip to Germany in 1570.  He died in Bruges.

References

External links
Hubert Goltzius on Artnet
The Hubertus Goltzius Prize awarded by the Royal Numismatic Society of Belgium

1526 births
1583 deaths
Flemish Renaissance painters
People from Venlo